Stendal is a district (Landkreis) in the north-east of Saxony-Anhalt, Germany. Its neighbouring districts are (clockwise from the south): Jerichower Land, Börde, Altmarkkreis Salzwedel, Lüchow-Dannenberg in Lower Saxony, and the districts of Prignitz, Ostprignitz-Ruppin and Havelland in Brandenburg.

History 
In the administrative reform of 1994 the previous district of Stendal was merged with the districts of Osterburg and Havelberg.

Geography 
The district is located in the Altmark region. Its highest elevation is the 132.8 metre high Landsberg. The main rivers in the district are the Elbe and the Havel.

Partnerships
In 1990, a friendship with the Russian Yartsevsky District was started, which grew into a partnership in 1996.  In 1994, a partnership with the Lithuanian district Mažeikiai was started. Further partnerships exist with the Lippe district in North Rhine-Westphalia and the Swedish municipality Vårgårda, and with the towns Płock (Poland), Havířov (Czech Republic), Saldus (Latvia), Paide (Estonia) and Karlshamn (Sweden).

Coat of arms 
The red eagle in the left of the coat of arms is the symbol of Brandenburg, representing that  historically the Altmark was part of Brandenburg. It also stands for the district Havelland. The golden trefoil with three oak leaves symbolizes the old district Stendal, and is taken from the coat of arms of the family Bismarck. The three golden diamonds on black ground come from the coat of arms of the dukes of Osterburg, representing the former district Osterburg.

Towns and municipalities 

The district of Stendal consists of the following subdivisions:

References

External links 

  (German)

 
Districts of Saxony-Anhalt